Dorothy is a female given name. It is the English vernacular form of the Greek Δωροθέα (Dōrothéa) meaning "God's Gift", from δῶρον (dōron), "gift" + θεός (theós), "god". . It has been in use since the 1400s. Although much less common, there are also male equivalents in English such as Dory, from the Greek masculine Δωρόθεος (Dōrótheos). Dorofei is a rarely used Russian male version of the name.  The given names Theodore and Theodora are derived from the same two Greek root words as Dorothy, albeit reversed in order. 

The name grew in use among Christians due to popular legends surrounding Saint Dorothy of Caeserea. The name was at one time viewed as the English equivalent of the etymologically unrelated Russian name Daria or its diminutive Dasha.

Traditional English diminutives include, among others, Do, Dodi, Dodie,  Doe, Doll, Dolley, Dollie, Dolly, Dora, Dori, Dorie, Doro, Dory, Dot, Dottie, Dotty, Tea, and Thea.

There are also many variants of the name in other languages.

Dorothy was a less common variant of Dorothea until it became more common and one of the top 10 most popular names for girls in the United States between 1904 and 1940. The name remained among the top 100 most popular names for American girls until 1961. It briefly left the top 1,000 names for girls in the United States in 2007 but returned in 2011 and has since increased in popularity. In 2021, it ranked 483rd among the most used names for newborn girls in the United States, with 643 girls given the name in that year. Variant Dorothea is in occasional use in the United States, where 73 girls were given the name in 2021.

Notable people 
Dorothy Allison, American writer
Dorothy Arnold, American socialite who disappeared mysteriously
Dorothy Arnold, American actress
Dorothy Appleby, American actress
Dorothy Bernard, American actress
Dorothy Christy, American actress
Dorothy "Dodie" Clark, British singer-songwriter and YouTuber
Dorothy Coburn, American actress
Dorothy Dalton, American actress
Dorothy Dandridge, American actress
Dorothy Davenport, American actress
Dorothy Day, American journalist, social activist
Dorothy Dell, American actress
Dorothy Devore, American actress
Dorothy Dunbar, American actress
Dorothy Dunnett, Scottish historical novelist
Dorothy Dwan, American actress
Dorothy Fletcher (1927–2017), New Zealand historian
D. C. Fontana (Dorothy Catherine Fontana, 1939–2019), screenplay writer
Dorothy Garlock, American author
Dorothy Garrod, British archaeologist
Dorothy Edna Genders, Australian Anglican deaconess
Dorothy Gibson, American actress 
Dorothy Gish, American actress
Dorothy Grant, Haida fashion designer
Dorothy Gulliver, American actress
Dorothy Hamill, American figure skater
Dorothy Hodgkin, British biochemist and winner of Nobel Prize in Chemistry
Dorothy Iannone (1933-2022), American visual artist
Dorothy Janis, American actress
Dorothy Misener Jurney, American journalist
Dorothy Kelly, American actress
Dorothy Kilgallen, American journalist and television game show panelist.
Dorothy Bush Koch, daughter of United States President George H. W. Bush and sister of President George W. Bush
Dorothy, Lady Pakington (1623–1679), English writer
Dorothy Lawrence (1896–1964), English reporter, secretly posed as a man to become a British soldier during World War I
Dorothy Bell Lawrence (1911–1973), New York assemblywoman
Dorothy Lee (actress), American actress-comedian
Dorothy Leigh (died ), British writer 
Dorothy Mabiletsa, South African politician 
Dorothy Mackaill (1903–1990), British-American actress
Dorothy Malone (1924–2018), American actress
Dorothy Manley (1927–2021), British sprinter
Dorothy Manning (1919–2012), New Zealand artist
Dorothy McAulay Martin (born 1937), First Lady of North Carolina
Dorothy McGuire (1916-2001), American actress
Dorothy Metcalf-Lindenburger, American astronaut
Dorothy Miner (1904–1973), American art historian
Dorothy Miner, American lawyer
Dorothy Moskowitz, American singer
 Dorothy Klenke Nash (1898–1976), American neurosurgeon 
Dorothy Parker (1893–1967), American satirist and poet
Dorothy Phillips, American actress
Dorothy Peto, first female police superintendent in the UK
Dorothy Revier, American actress
Dorothy Robertson (died 1979), New Zealand painter
Dorothy H. Rose (1920–2005), New York assemblywoman
Dorothy L. Sayers (1893–1957), English writer
Dorothy Kuhn Oko (1896–1971), librarian and labor unionist
Dorothy Scharf, English philanthropist
Dorothy Seastrom, American actress
Dorothy Sebastian, American actress
Dorothy Squires (1915–1998), Welsh singer
Dorothy Stang (1931–2005), Catholic nun of the Sisters of Notre Dame de Namur
Dorothy Stanley-Turner (1916–1995), English racing driver
Dorothy Sterling, American writer
Dorothy Stratten, Canadian Playboy Playmate, model and actress
Dorothy Mae Taylor (1928–2000), African-American politician and civil rights activist
Dorothy Ann Thrupp (1779–1847), English psalmist, hymnwriter, translator 
Dorothy Vaughan (1910–2008), African American mathematician and human computer who worked for NACA and NASA
Dorothy Vest, American tennis player
Dorothy Wall (1894–1942), New Zealand-born author
Dorothy Wallace, American mathematician
Dorothy Wang, American television personality
Dorothy Grace Waring (1891–1977), English fascist campaigner and novelist
Dorothy Wordsworth, sister of William Wordsworth

Animals 
 Dorofei (2004-2014), the male pet cat of former Russian President Dmitry Medvedev

Fictional characters

Dorothy Gale, the little girl who was blown to the Land of Oz by a cyclone in L. Frank Baum's 1900 book The Wonderful Wizard of Oz and the classic 1939 movie adaptation The Wizard of Oz
Doll Tearsheet, also referred to as "Mistress Dorothy", a prostitute in Shakespeare's play Henry IV, Part 2
Dorothy Zbornak, played by Bea Arthur on the long-running TV sitcom The Golden Girls
 Dorothy Albright, a character from the video game series Arcana Heart
 Dorothy, a goldfish owned by Elmo in Sesame Street
 Dorothy Michaels, alias used by the female impersonator in the 1982 comedy film Tootsie, played by Dustin Hoffman
 Dorothy Cramp, a character from the animated series The Cramp Twins
R. Dorothy Wayneright, female android in the anime series Big O
Dot Branning, fictional character on the television show  EastEnders
Dot, fictional character from the 2005 film The Quiet
Dorothy Catalonia, a character from the Gundam Wing anime series
Dorothy Williams, a character from the TV series Miss Fisher's Murder Mysteries
 Dorothy, a talented archer, with low self esteem from Fire Emblem: The Binding Blade
Dorothy the Dinosaur, a character from The Wiggles
Dorothy "Ace" McShane, a companion of the Seventh Doctor from Doctor Who, played by Sophie Aldred

See also
Dorothea (disambiguation)
Dorothee (given name)

References

Given names
English given names
English feminine given names
Given names of Greek language origin
Theophoric names